James J. Hines (December 29, 1903 – May 11, 1986) was an American professional golfer.

Early life 
Hines was born in Mineola, New York.

Professional career 
In 1920, Hines "got his start" at Wheatley Hills Golf Club. Four years later, he got a job as assistant professional at Hempstead Golf Club. He worked there for eight years. Later, he worked as professional at Timber Point and Garden City. On October 26, 1937, Hines became the new professional at Lakeville Golf Club.

Hines won nine times on the PGA Tour and was selected to the 1939 Ryder Cup team but the event was cancelled due to World War II.

On the 13th hole at the 1938 PGA tournament, his chip shot hit opponent Sam Snead's ball, sending both into the cup. A birdie two was awarded to both players, who were tied at that point. Snead wound up beating Hines by one stroke.

Personal life 
Hines died in Monterey, California.

Professional wins

PGA Tour wins (9)
 1933 (1) Glens Falls Open
 1935 (1) St. Augustine Pro-Amateur
 1936 (3) Riverside Open, Los Angeles Open, Glens Falls Open
 1937 (2) Metropolitan Open, Glens Falls Open
 1938 (1) Metropolitan Open
 1945 (1) Tacoma Open

Other wins (5)
 1935 Long Island Open
 1937 Long Island PGA Championship
 1940 Metropolitan PGA Championship
 1941 Long Island PGA Championship
 1949 Arizona Open

Results in major championships

NYF = tournament not yet founded
NT = no tournament
CUT = missed the half-way cut
R64, R32, R16, QF, SF = round in which player lost in PGA Championship match play
"T" = tied

Summary

 Most consecutive cuts made – 25 (1935 PGA – 1948 PGA)
 Longest streak of top-10s – 4 (1933 PGA – 1935 Masters)

References

See also
 List of golfers with most PGA Tour wins

American male golfers
PGA Tour golfers
Golfers from California
Golfers from New York (state)
People from Mineola, New York
Sportspeople from Monterey, California
1903 births
1986 deaths